Shafi may refer to:

Shafi`i, one of the four schools of Islamic law in Sunni Islam
Shafi (director), an Indian director
Shafi (actor), a Telugu actor
Shafi, a fictional character played by Ikramul Hoque in the British web series Corner Shop Show
Shafi, Iran, a village in Razavi Khorasan Province, Iran